Sangtiandao Station is the Western terminus of Line 2, Suzhou Rail Transit located in Gusu District of Suzhou. It started operation on September 24, 2016, with the opening of the Baodaiqiao South - Sangtiandao extension on Line 2. Upon completion of Line 6, the station will act as one of three interchanges between the lines.

References 

Railway stations in Jiangsu
Suzhou Rail Transit stations
Railway stations in China opened in 2016